Church of the Holy Apostles or Church of the Twelve Apostles may refer to:

Albania
 Holy Apostles' Church, Hoshtevë

Germany 
 Basilica of the Holy Apostles, Cologne

Greece
 Church of the Holy Apostles, Athens
 Church of the Holy Apostles (Thessaloniki)

Israel
 Church of the Holy Apostles in Capernaum, Greek Orthodox

Italy
 Church of the Twelve Holy Apostles, Rome
 Church of the Holy Apostles, Florence
 Church of the Holy Apostles of Christ, Venice

Romania
Church of the Holy Apostles, Bucharest
Church of the Holy Apostles, Focșani

Russia
 Church of the Twelve Apostles in the Moscow Kremlin, known also as Church of the Holy Apostles

Turkey
 Church of the Holy Apostles, Istanbul
 Church of the Holy Apostles, Kars

United Kingdom
 Pro-Cathedral of the Holy Apostles, Bristol

United States
 Holy Apostles Episcopal Church (Satellite Beach, Florida)
 Church of the Holy Apostles, Hilo, Hawaii
 Church of the Holy Apostles (Manhattan), New York
 Church of the Holy Apostles (Barnwell, South Carolina)
 Church of the Holy Apostles (Oneida, Wisconsin)